Richard Alan Jesse Spiers (27 November 1937 – 22 October 2000) was an English professional football centre half who made over 450 appearances in the Football League for Reading. As of December 2012, he is third on Reading's all-time appearances list with 505.

References 

1937 births
2000 deaths
Sportspeople from Oxfordshire
English footballers
English Football League players
Association football wing halves
Reading F.C. players
Banbury United F.C. players